Walter Merritt Riggs (January 24, 1873 – January 22, 1924) was the president of Clemson University from 1910 to 1924 and the "father of Clemson football" coaching the first football team for what was then Clemson College. Riggs was president of Clemson during one of its most challenging times, during World War I, when enrollment dropped due to students joining the military or going home to help on family farms. Riggs graduated from the Agricultural and Mechanical College of Alabama (now Auburn University) with a Bachelor of Science in engineering in 1892 and was a member of Auburn's first football team. He was also president of his class, director of the glee club, and a member of Phi Delta Theta fraternity while at Auburn. Riggs was the second president of the Southern Intercollegiate Athletic Association, taking over for William Lofland Dudley in 1912.

Riggs Hall, which is the home of Clemson's College of Engineering, Computing and Applied Sciences, is named in his honor.

Head coaching record

References

External links
 

1873 births
1924 deaths
19th-century players of American football
American football ends
Auburn Tigers baseball players
Auburn Tigers football players
Clemson Tigers athletic directors
Clemson Tigers football coaches
Presidents of Clemson University
People from Orangeburg, South Carolina